Carlos Betancourt (born 10 November 1957) is a Venezuelan footballer. He played in seven matches for the Venezuela national football team from 1983 to 1989. He was also part of Venezuela's squad for the 1983 Copa América tournament.

References

External links
 

1957 births
Living people
Venezuelan footballers
Venezuela international footballers
Place of birth missing (living people)
Association football forwards